Crop oil or crop oil concentrates are petroleum-based additives that are used as adjuvants to increase the efficacy of pesticides in agricultural applications.

References

See also 
 pesticides 
 Petroleum additives

Pesticides